The Northern Cricket Union of Ireland, more usually referred to as the N.C.U., is one of five provincial governing bodies in Ireland. Along with the Connacht, Leinster, Munster and North West unions, it makes up the Irish Cricket Union (now known as Cricket Ireland), the supreme governing body of Irish cricket.

The North of Ireland jurisdiction covers counties Antrim, Armagh and Down and part of Tyrone in Northern Ireland.

The object of the NCU is "to promote and improve cricket generally in Northern Ireland among men and women, the able-bodied and the disabled".

The Union was founded in 1886 and is the oldest of the five provincial unions. It has organised the NCU Challenge Cup since 1887 and the NCU Senior League since 1897. In 2005, there were 50 clubs fielding 137 teams affiliated to the union.

In 2013, Cricket Ireland formed a three-day Interprovincial Championship, featuring teams from Leinster, NCU and the North West. The NCU team is known as the Northern Knights.

See also
NCU Junior Cup
List of Northern Ireland cricket clubs

References

External links
The Northern Cricket Union official website

Irish provincial cricket unions
 
Cric
1886 establishments in Ireland